The 1999 Sparkassen Cup singles was the tennis singles event of the tenth edition of the Sparkassen Cup; a WTA Tier II tournament held in Leipzig, Germany. Steffi Graf was the defending champion but retired after Wimbledon earlier in the year.

After losing in last year's final, Nathalie Tauziat won the title this year, defeating qualifier Květa Hrdličková, 6–1, 6–3.

Seeds
The top four seeds received a bye to the second round.

Draw

Finals

Top half

Bottom half

Qualifying

Seeds

Qualifiers

Qualifying draw

First qualifier

Second qualifier

Third qualifier

Fourth qualifier

External links
 1999 Sparkassen Cup draw 

Sparkassen Cup (tennis)
1999 WTA Tour